Omega Draconis, Latinized from ω Draconis and also known as 28 Draconis, is a binary star in the constellation of Draco. The system is fairly close, and is located about 76 light-years (23 parsecs) away, based on its parallax.

Omega Draconis is a spectroscopic binary, which means the two stellar components are too close to be resolved but periodic Doppler shifts in their spectra indicate orbital motion. In this case, light from both stars can be detected, and it is a double-lined spectroscopic binary. The orbital period of the system is 5.28 days, and the eccentricity of the system is 0.00220, implying a nearly circular orbit.

Naming
With 27 Draconis, it composed the Arabs' الأظفار الذئب al-ʼaẓfār al-dhiʼb, "the hyena's claws" in the asterism of the Mother Camels. The two stars have been distinguished as Adfar Aldib I (ω) and Adfar Aldib II (27 Draconis).

References

Draco (constellation)
F-type main-sequence stars
Draconis, Omega
Spectroscopic binaries
086201
Draconis, 28
160922
6596
Durchmusterung objects
4017